Events from 2020 in the European Union.

Incumbents 
 President of the European Council –  Charles Michel
 Commission President –  Ursula von der Leyen 
 Council Presidency –  Croatia (Jan – Jun 2020),  Germany (July – Dec 2020)
 Parliament President –  David Sassoli
 High Representative –  Josep Borrell

Events

January 

 31 January – The United Kingdom and Gibraltar left the European Union.

July 
 July - The European Union refuses an offer of 500 million doses of Covid-19 vaccine from Pfizer-BioNTech.

November 

 17 November – Hungary and Poland veto the seven-year EU budget, over attempts to link funding to respect for rule of law. They both said that linking funding to rule of law will mean a loss to their nation's sovereignty.

December 

 17 December – The European Court of Justice rules that EU states can ban kosher and halal ritual slaughter.

See also

Country overviews
 European Union
 History of European Union
 Outline of European Union
 Politics of European Union
 Timeline of European Union history
 Years in European Union
 History of modern European Union 
 Government of European Union

Related timelines for current period
 2020
 2020 in politics and government
 2020s

References 

 
Years of the 21st century in the European Union
2020s in the European Union